Winner Stays On is the fourth studio album by London-based grime music collective Roll Deep, it was released on 8 November 2010. Three singles have been released from the album, including "Good Times" and "Green Light", which both went to number 1 in the UK, plus the top 30 hit "Take Control", which features Alesha Dixon.

At the time of recording, the collective consisted of DJ Target, Flowdan, Breeze, Danny Weed, DJ Karnage, J2K, Manga, Brazen and Scratchy.

Singles
 "Good Times" was the first single released from the album, it was released on 26 April 2010. It reached #1 on the UK Singles Chart making it their first number one single in the UK. It also charted at #13 on the Irish Singles Chart. It also became a top ten hit in Slovakia and on the European Hot 100 Singles Chart.
 "Green Light" was the second single released from the album, it was released on 15 August 2010. It reached #1 on the UK Singles Chart their second number one single in the UK.  It also charted at #18 on the Irish Singles Chart and became a top 40 hit in the Netherlands.
 "Take Control" was the third and final single to be released from the album, it was released on 1 November 2010. It reached a peak of #29 on the UK Singles Chart before falling out of the top 40 the week after. It peaked at #27 in Scotland.

Critical reception

The album has received negative to mixed reviews, however the BBC were positive stating that "as an underground group with commercial ambitions, you face a difficult hurdle: how to take an original, boundary-shifting but sometimes unpalatable sound and break it into a mass audience without spoiling the integrity of what you do in the process? It's a hurdle that Roll Deep faced back in 2005 with the release of their debut album, In at the Deep End. A grime crew forged in the east London neighbourhood of Bow, Roll Deep have seen now-popular names like Dizzee Rascal, Wiley, Tinchy Stryder and 1xtra DJ Target rise through its ranks. For ...Deep End, though, it turned out that snappy grime numbers like When I'm 'Ere lacked the commercial appeal of crossover tunes such as The Avenue and Shake a Leg.

Roll Deep, then, have evolved into a curious – albeit not terribly uncommon – thing: a grime crew that doesn't play grime. Their fourth album, Winner Stays On, is, flagrantly, a pop album, and the good news is that they're getting better at it. Good Times, which hit number one in the charts back in May, is excellent: a deliberately glitzy celebration of kicking up one's heels, tales of high-street consumerism and clubbing propelled upwards on ecstatic synth bumps and a yearning chorus courtesy of Jodie Connor. Both Take Control (complete with a vocal from Alesha Dixon) and Green Light, a Calvin Harris-style pop bounce that wraps cheeky mating-game raps around a Green Cross Code-friendly metaphor, stick to a similar formula – and while this is obvious stuff, it's certainly well-done.

Elsewhere, there are a couple of moments that hark back to Roll Deep's grime genesis. Out the Blue finds Scratchy, Breeze, Brazen and Wiley dropping rhymes over booming sub-bass. And while Team is not exactly lyrically spectacular – it features Wiley's habitual fall-back of ending every line with the same word – it smashes it through busy, zig-zagging synth and sheer force of numbers. More quality grime would be nice, but Winner Stays on proves Roll Deep are no longer an underground crew trying to make pop: the charts are there for the taking."

Track list

Charts

Release history

References

2010 albums
Roll Deep albums